Gluviopsilla is a monotypic genus of daesiid camel spiders, first described by Carl Friedrich Roewer in 1933. Its single species, Gluviopsilla discolor is distributed in Algeria, Greece (Rhodes), Iran, Somalia, Syria and Turkey.

References 

Solifugae
Arachnid genera
Monotypic arachnid genera